As a nickname, Huck may refer to:

 Huck Betts (1897–1987), American Major League Baseball pitcher
 McDill "Huck" Boyd (1907–1987), American small-town newspaper publisher and politician
 Huck Flener (born 1969), American former Major League Baseball pitcher
 Huck Geary (1917–1981), American Major League Baseball player
 Mike Huckleberry (born 1948), American politician and restaurateur 
 Hector Macpherson, Jr. (born 1918), American retired politician and dairy farmer
 Carl Sawyer (1890–1957), American Major League Baseball player in 1915
 Richard Scarry (1919–1994), American children's author and illustrator
 Huck Seed (born 1969), American poker player
 Huck Wallace (1882–1951), American Major League Baseball pitcher in 1912
 Huck Welch (1907–1979), Hall of Fame Canadian Football League player
 Allan Woodman (1899–1963), Canadian hockey player

See also 

Lists of people by nickname